Air Algérie Flight 2208 was a cargo flight between Algiers-Houari Boumediene Airport, Algiers, Algeria, and Frankfurt Airport, Germany.  On 13 August 2006, the Lockheed L-100 operating the flight crashed in Northern Italy as a result of an autopilot malfunction. The aircraft struck the ground in a sparsely populated area after a very steep and rapid descent, narrowly avoiding crashing into a highly populated area. The crew of three on board were killed in the accident; there were no passengers, nor were there injuries or property damage on the ground.

Accident
The 25-year-old aircraft, a Lockheed L-100-30 Hercules, registration 7T-VHG, was operating a cargo service between Algiers-Houari Boumediene Airport and Frankfurt Airport as Flight 2208; it was flying over Italian soil at  when it began descending for unknown reasons.

The pilot was able to direct the aircraft's descent towards a sparsely populated area. It struck the ground between Milan and Parma in a village named Besurica, located in the outskirts of Piacenza. Upon impacting, the airframe broke in two. According to the Corriere della Sera, the impact was so devastating that the wreckage of the aircraft was strewn over several kilometres, while the loud noise of the crash was heard in the city proper. The upper portion of the rudder and parts of the elevator were found  and  ahead of the impact point, respectively.

The aircraft narrowly avoided crashing into highly populated areas, to the extent that the mayor of Piacenza referred to the occurrence as a miracle. There were neither injuries nor property damage on the ground, but the crew of three on board lost their lives in the accident.

Investigation
The National Agency for the Safety of Flight (ANSV) started an inquiry, following the recovery of the cockpit voice recorder a week after the crash. The flight data recorder was also recovered, and results from its decoded ribbon showed that the aircraft was flying at cruising altitude with the autopilot engaged, that it got disengaged twelve seconds after the autopilot failure light lit, and that both directional and longitudinal control was lost moments later, with the aircraft crashing 73 seconds after the light came on.

Aftermath
Given that the aircraft flight data recorder (FDR) was a first generation one manufactured in the 1960s, it was not in compliance with ICAO regulations. The ANSV urged the Algerian Civil Aviation Authority to replace older FDRs with newest ones.

See also

 Air Algérie Flight 6289

Footnotes

Notes

References

External links

National Agency for the Safety of Flight
 "Incidente L-100-30 precipitato vicino a Piacenza: emanata una raccomandazione di sicurezza." (Archive, Printer friendly, Archive) 1 February 2007. 
 "Rinvenuto FDR del Lockheed L-100-30 precipitato lo scorso agosto ." (Archive, Print friendly, Archive) 11 October 2006. 
 "Incidente aereo a Piacenza. Deceduti gli occupanti." (Archive, Print friendly, Archive) 14 August 2006. 
 "Rapporto informativo sull'attività svolta dall'agenzia anno 2007." (Archive) 
 "Rapporto informativo sull'attività svolta dall'agenzia anno 2006." (Archive) 
  

Air Algérie accidents and incidents
Airliner accidents and incidents caused by instrument failure
Aviation accidents and incidents in 2006
Aviation accidents and incidents in Italy
2006 in Italy
August 2006 events in Europe
Accidents and incidents involving the Lockheed C-130 Hercules
2006 disasters in Italy